Menkes is a surname. Notable people with the surname include:

John Menkes (1928– 2008), Austrian-American pediatric neurologist and author of fictional novels and plays
Murray Menkes (died 2013),  Canadian property developer
Nina Menkes (born 1955), American women film director
Suzy Menkes (born 1943), British fashion journalist

See also 
Menkes disease, also known as Menkes syndrome, is an X-linked recessive disorder caused by mutations in genes coding for the copper-transport protein ATP7A,  leading to copper deficiency
Menke